The Abbala people are an Arab ethnic group of the Sahel located in Sudan and Chad. The Abbala are named after their subsistence practice of camel herding. 

The term "Abbala" is mostly used in Sudan to distinguish them from the Baggara, a grouping of Arab ethnicities who herd cattle. Although, the two groupings share a common origin from the Juhayna tribe of the Arabian peninsula and it is a common way to distinguish Rizeigat who herd camels in Northern Darfur and those who herd cows in Southern Darfur. According to Braukämp (1993) some of the Abbala people experienced a cultural change to Baggara culture after being pushed from the Sahel region into the savanna. This resulted in a switch in livestock to cattle, which are better adapted to the savanna environment.

See also
 Baggara

References 

Ethnic groups in North Africa
Arab diaspora in Africa